BAM Nuttall Limited (formerly known as Edmund Nuttall Limited) is a construction and civil engineering company headquartered in Camberley, United Kingdom. It has been involved in a portfolio of road, rail, nuclear, and other major projects worldwide. It is a subsidiary of the Dutch Royal BAM Group.

History

The company was founded by James Nuttall Snr in Manchester in 1865, to undertake engineering works associated with infrastructure developments, such as the Manchester Ship Canal, which opened in 1894 and the narrow gauge Lynton and Barnstaple Railway, which opened in 1898.

In the 1900s and 1910s James Nuttall Snr's two sons—Sir Edmund Nuttall, 1st Baronet (1870–1923), who was made a baronet in 1922, and James Nuttall (1877–1957)—built the company into a nationwide business. In the 1920s and 1930s the company was run by Sir Edmund's son, Sir Keith Nuttall, 2nd Baronet (1901–1941), who served in the Royal Engineers in the Second World War. Other members of the family also involved were Sir Keith's brother Clive Nuttall (1906–1936) and their cousin (James Nuttall's son) Norman Nuttall (1907–1996). In 1941 Sir Keith's shares were inherited by his eight-year-old son, Sir Nicholas Nuttall, 3rd Baronet (1933–2007). During the Second World War the company was one of the contractors engaged in building the Mulberry harbour units.

In 1978 the company was bought by Hollandsche Beton Groep (later HBG), a Dutch group, and in 2002 HBG was acquired by Royal BAM Group.

On 10 October 2008 Edmund Nuttall Limited changed its name to BAM Nuttall Limited.

Major projects
Major projects undertaken by the company include:

the Liver Building completed in 1911
the Queensway Tunnel under the Mersey completed in 1932
the Dartford Tunnel completed in 1963
the Tyne Tunnel completed in 1967
the Kingsway Tunnel completed in 1971
the Liverpool Merseyrail underground Loop Railway, now called the Wirral Line, completed in 1978
the Medway Tunnel completed in 1996
High Speed 1 completed in 2007
the Cambridgeshire Guided Busway completed in 2011
soil remediation and civil engineering works for the 2012 Summer Olympics completed in 2012
the Victoria Underground station North Ticketing Hall completed in 2017
the enlarged ticket hall at Tottenham Court Road tube station for Crossrail completed in 2017
the Cross Tay Link Road due to be completed in 2024

BAM Buttall is also involved in HS2 lots C2 and C3, working as part of a joint venture, due to complete in 2031.

An alliance of companies that includes BAM Nuttall has been appointed preferred bidder for works as part of the Transpennine Route Upgrade between Manchester and Leeds with a projected completion date of between 2036 and 2041.

Climate protest
On 5 June 2005, following their bid for a contract to construct the Kingsnorth power station, the company headquarters in Camberley, Surrey were invaded by climate protesters. Thirteen protesters took part in invading the offices, asking to speak about the chairman, distributing leaflets and unfurling a banner. The action resulted in five arrests; however the cases were thrown out with no case to answer.

See also 
 British industrial narrow gauge railways
 Interserve
 Speller Metcalfe
 Clancy Docwra
 Wirral Line

References

Sources

External links
 Official site

Construction and civil engineering companies of the United Kingdom
Lynton and Barnstaple Railway
Companies based in Surrey
British companies established in 1865
Nuttall family
Construction and civil engineering companies established in 1865
1865 establishments in England